The Fire from Within is an album by the American jazz violinist Billy Bang recorded in 1984 and released on the Italian Soul Note label.

Reception
The Allmusic review by Stephen Cook awarded the album 4½ stars stating "Billy Bang's The Fire From Within nicely shows off the violinist's unique approach to post-bop jazz from swingers to ballads, trad to free... A perfect entrée for Billy Bang newcomers".

Track listing
All compositions by Billy Bang
 "The Glow of Awareness" - 5:38 
 "The Nagual Julian" - 5:46 
 "The Shift Below" - 6:24 
 "Petty Tyrants" - 5:32 
 "The New Seers" - 10:41 
 "The Mold of Man" - 7:34 
 "Inorganic Beings" - 5:29
Recorded at Vanguard Studios in New York City on September 19 & 29, 1984

Personnel
Billy Bang - violin
Ahmed Abdullah - trumpet
Oscar Sanders - guitar
William Parker – bass
Thurman Barker - marimba
John Betsch – drums, cowbells
Charles Bobo Shaw - cowbells (track 2)

References

Black Saint/Soul Note albums
Billy Bang albums
1984 albums